Mansor Sharahili [منصور شراحيلي in Arabic] (born 26 March 1991) is a Saudi football player. He currently plays as a right back for Al-Entesar.

References

External links 
 

1991 births
Living people
Saudi Arabian footballers
Ittihad FC players
Al-Wehda Club (Mecca) players
Damac FC players
Al-Kholood Club players
Wej SC players
Al-Entesar Club players
Sportspeople from Jeddah
Saudi First Division League players
Saudi Professional League players
Saudi Second Division players
Association football fullbacks